Francisco Fernández Rodríguez (born 4 March 1944 at Puerto Real), nicknamed Gallego, is a former Spanish footballer, in the defender position.

During his club career, Gallego played for Sevilla FC (1961–65, 1975–80, with 185 first division matches and 9 goals) and FC Barcelona (1965–75, adding a further 248 games with 17 goals). He won the 1973–74 national championship.

Gallego earned 36 caps for the Spain national football team and played in the 1966 FIFA World Cup.

Honours

Club
Barcelona
Primera División: 1973–74
Copa del Rey: 1967–68, 1970–71
Inter-Cities Fairs Cup: 1965–66, 1971

International
Spain
European Football Championship: 1964

See also
 List of FC Barcelona players (100+ appearances)
 List of La Liga players (400+ appearances)

External links

National team data 

FC Barcelona archives 
FC Barcelona profile
International appearances, at RSSSF

1944 births
Living people
People from Puerto Real
Sportspeople from the Province of Cádiz
Spanish footballers
Association football defenders
La Liga players
Sevilla FC players
FC Barcelona players
Spain youth international footballers
Spain B international footballers
Spain international footballers
1964 European Nations' Cup players
1966 FIFA World Cup players
UEFA European Championship-winning players
Catalonia international guest footballers